A statue of Beatriz Hernández is installed in Guadalajara, in the Mexican state of Jalisco.

References

External links

 

Centro, Guadalajara
Monuments and memorials in Jalisco
Outdoor sculptures in Guadalajara
Sculptures of women in Mexico
Statues in Jalisco